This is the discography for American hip hop musician K Camp. It consists of five studio albums, three extended plays, thirteen mixtapes, and twenty-two singles (including seven a featured artist).

Albums

Studio albums

Extended plays

Mixtapes

Singles

As lead artist

As featured artist

Notes

References 

Discographies of American artists
Hip hop discographies